Those Blasted Kids or Those damned kids is a 1947 Danish film based on a play of the same name by Estrid Ott. It was directed by Astrid Henning-Jensen, Bjarne Henning-Jensen and was produced by Fleming Lynge.

Cast
 Henry Nielsen
 Tove Maës
 Sigrid Horne-Rasmussen
 Preben Neergaard
 Knud Heglund
 Jakob Nielsen
 Preben Kaas
 Carl Ottosen
 Per Buckhøj
 Bodil Lindorff
 Valsø Holm
 Ebbe Langberg
 Ole Petersson
 Christian Eriksen

References

External links

1940s Danish-language films
Films directed by Astrid Henning-Jensen
Films directed by Bjarne Henning-Jensen
Danish black-and-white films